Dreyfus is a surname. Notable people with the surname include:

Actors 
 Alexandra Dreyfus (born 1986), American actress
 Chuckie Dreyfus (born 1974), Filipino actor
 James Dreyfus (born 1968), English actor
 Jean-Claude Dreyfus (born 1946), French actor
 Julie Dreyfus (born 1966), French actress
 Julia Louis-Dreyfus (born 1961), American actress and comedian
 Anouk Aimée (born Dreyfus, 1932), French actress

Other people
 Alfred Dreyfus (1859–1935), French Jewish military officer and focus of the Dreyfus affair
 Auguste Dreyfus (1827–1897), French guano merchant, financier
 Camille Dreyfus (chemist) (1878–1956), Swiss chemist
 Camille Ferdinand Dreyfus (1849–1915), French lawyer who was Senator for Seine-et-Oise from 1909 to 1915
 Charles Dreyfus (1848–1935), British-French Zionist and businessman
 Édouard Dreyfus Gonzalez (1876–1941) French lawyer and composer as "Jean Dora"
 Ferdinand-Camille Dreyfus (1851–1915), French journalist and politician
 Francis Dreyfus (1940–2010), French record producer, father of Julie Dreyfus
 George Dreyfus (born 1928), Australian composer, father of Mark Dreyfus
 Gérard Louis-Dreyfus (1932-2016), French-American businessman (Louis Dreyfus Group), father of Julia Louis-Dreyfus, cousin of Robert Louis-Dreyfus
 Harry Dreyfus (1891–1978), American businessman implicated in the Secret Court of 1920
 Henri Dreyfus (1882–1944), Swiss chemist and co-inventor of Celanese
 Hubert Dreyfus (1929–2017), American philosopher (University of California, Berkeley), brother of Stuart Dreyfus
 Huguette Dreyfus (1928–2016), French harpsichordist
 Jack Dreyfus (1913–2009), American financier, founder of the Dreyfus Corporation
 Jean-Marc Dreyfus, French historian
 Jérôme Dreyfus (born 1971), French judoka
 Karen Dreyfus, American violist
 Laurence Dreyfus (born 1952), American baroque music scholar and viol player
 Lee S. Dreyfus (1926–2008), American politician, Governor of Wisconsin (1979–1983)
 Mark Dreyfus (born 1956), Australian lawyer and politician, MP for Isaacs (2007–present), son of George Dreyfus
 Max Dreyfus (1874–1964), German-born American music publisher
 Pablo Dreyfus (1969/70–2009), Argentine arms controller
 Philippe Dreyfus, French informatics pioneer
 Pierre Dreyfus (1907–1994), French civil servant, politician and businessman (Renault)
 René Dreyfus (1905–1993), French Grand Prix motor racing driver
 Robert Louis-Dreyfus (1946–2009), French businessman (Adidas-Salomon), cousin of Gérard Louis-Dreyfus
 Stuart Dreyfus, American academic, engineer and author (University of California, Berkeley), brother of Hubert Dreyfus
 Tony Dreyfus (born 1939), French politician, Member of the National Assembly for Paris (1997–2012)
 Yves Dreyfus (born 1931), French Olympic fencer

Fictional characters 
 Chief Inspector Dreyfus, character in  The Pink Panther film series
 Dreyfus, the main human antagonist in the 2014 film Dawn of the Planet of the Apes
 Shosanna [sic = Shoshanna] Dreyfus, one of the principal characters in Inglourious Basterds

See also
Dreyfuss

References 

Jewish surnames
German-language surnames